Daniel Andersson may refer to:

Daniel Andersson (footballer, born 1972), Swedish football goalkeeper
Daniel Andersson (footballer, born 1977), Swedish football midfielder
Daniel Andersson (politician) (born 1986), Swedish politician
Daniel Andersson (speedway rider), Swedish speedway rider
Dan Andersson (1888–1920), Swedish author and poet

See also
Daniel Anderson (disambiguation)